Micah Tyler Begnaud (born April 19, 1983), known professionally as Micah Tyler, is an American Christian musician, who primarily plays Christian pop music. He has released four musical works: two studio albums, The Story I Tell (2013) and New Today (2020), and two extended plays, The Kitchen Sink (2014) and Different (2016) with Fair Trade Services. Both the Different album and the New Today album charted on one Billboard magazine chart.

Early life and background
Begnaud was born, Micah Tyler Begnaud, on April 19, 1983, in Beaumont, Texas, the eldest son of Peter and Gaynell Begnaud (née, Whitmire), while he was raised with a brother, Daniel, in Buna, Texas. 

He became a youth pastor after graduating from high school at the age of eighteen. He also ran a food truck before turning to music full time.

Music career
His music recording career started in 2013, with the studio album, The Story I Tell, while he also independently released an extended play the following year, The Kitchen Sink. In 2015, he had his first viral video with his performance of an original satirical song, "You've Gotta Love Millennials." The video received tens of millions of views within days across Facebook and YouTube. Begnaud released another extended play, Different, with Fair Trade Services, on November 4, 2016, while this peaked on the Billboard magazine Christian Albums chart at No. 38.

In 2020, Begnaud released "New Today," a full length album which reached No. 25 on the Billboard Magazine Christian Albums chart.

Personal life
Begnaud is married to Casey Begnaud, and together they have three children. They reside in Buna, Texas.

Discography

Albums

EPs

Singles

Promotional singles

Notes and references

External links
 

1983 births
Living people
American performers of Christian music
Musicians from Texas
Songwriters from Texas
Fair Trade Services artists